The United States Basketball League (USBL) was a professional men's spring basketball league. The league was formed in 1985 and ceased operations in 2008. The USBL started in 1985 as one of the first basketball leagues to play a late-spring to early-summer schedule. The league quickly became known as a development league for players, with many players moving up to the NBA and many more playing in Europe after stints here. In 1996, the league made a stock offering, a rarity among sports leagues. However, in later years, the league declined as rival leagues appeared and USBL had a tougher time replacing teams that folded. In the last two seasons, the league was mainly a midwestern league, with teams mainly in Kansas, Nebraska, and Oklahoma. 
After speculation that the USBL might fold after the 2007 season, the league announced that it would sit out the 2008 season and consider its options for the future. In January 2010, the league expressed hopes to resume play in April 2010.  However, no further news has surfaced from the league. The final champions are the Kansas Cagerz, who won the title game on July 1, 2007.

History
The United States Basketball League was founded in December 1984 by Daniel T. Meisenheimer, a stockbroker from Connecticut. The league management initially planned to schedule about 40 games during the summer, and started to look for new teams to join the newly formed USBL. Former NBA referee Richie Powers was named the league's vice president and director of operations, while Earl Monroe was the commissioner. Meisenheimer introduced a salary cap of $250,000 per team. The teams for the first season were the Connecticut Colonials from New Haven, Connecticut; the New Jersey Jammers from Jersey City, New Jersey; the Long Island Knights from Long Island, New York (owned by Meisenheimer himself); the Rhode Island Gulls from Warwick, Rhode Island; the Springfield Fame from Springfield, Massachusetts; the Westchester Golden Apples from Westchester, New York; and the Wildwood Aces from Wildwood, New Jersey. Several players with NBA experience joined the USBL: among them Ken Bannister, Jim Bostic, Tracy Jackson, Lowes Moore, Eddie Lee Wilkins and Sam Worthen. Other players who played in the 1985 USBL season would later play in the NBA, such as Michael Adams, Manute Bol, Ron Crevier, Spud Webb and John "Hot Rod" Williams. After the regular season ended after each team played 25 games, the league management decided not to organize postseason games, since many players were going to join other teams for the start of the regular season of other leagues such as the NBA or the CBA. The first USBL champions were the Springfield Fame, that had ended the regular season leading the league with a 19–6 record. Hot Rod Williams and Tracy Jackson were named co-MVPs, while Manute Bol led the league both in rebounds per game (14.2) and blocks per game (11.2).

In 1986 two teams, the Long Island Knights and the Rhode Island Gulls, left the league, and three new franchises joined the USBL: the Gold Coast Stingrays from West Palm Beach, Florida, the Staten Island Stallions from Staten Island, New York and the Tampa Bay Flash from Tampa, Florida. In the same year Nancy Lieberman joined the Springfield Fame and became the first female player to play in a professional league with men. Lieberman debuted in June 1986 in a game against the Staten Island Stallions, playing 3 minutes during which she did not score. In 1987 another woman joined the USBL: Lynette Richardson, who had played college basketball at Florida International, signed for the Miami Tropics. On June 13, 1987, Richardson and Lieberman played against each other during a game between the Miami Tropics and the Long Island Knights: Richardson scored 3 points while Lieberman scored 2.

The top teams of the regular season advanced to the USBL Postseason Festival, a playoffs system that saw teams play single elimination games in order to advance to the final game. On three occasions (1985, 1986 and 1990) no postseason was held, and the team with the best regular season record won the championship. In 1989 the USBL ceased operations temporarily in order to improve its organization, and resumed the following season, in 1990.

Complete team list

USBL Champions 
Teams played a single championship game at the end of the playoffs to name the league champions
1985 Springfield Fame (19–6) won regular season, no playoffs
1986 Tampa Bay Flash (22–8) won regular season, no playoffs
1987 Miami Tropics 103 Rhode Island Gulls 99
1988 New Haven Skyhawks 134 Palm Beach Stingrays 126
1989 USBL suspended operations
1990 Jacksonville Hooters (15–1) won regular season, no playoffs
1991 Philadelphia Spirit 110 Miami Tropics 108
1992 Miami Tropics 116 Philadelphia Spirit 114
1993 Miami Tropics 139 Westchester Stallions 127
1994 Jacksonville Hooters 117 Atlanta Trojans 109
1995 Florida Sharks 109 Atlanta Trojans 104
1996 Florida Sharks 118 Atlantic City Seagulls 115
1997 Atlantic City Seagulls 114 Long Island Surf 112
1998 Atlantic City Seagulls 100 Long Island Surf 96
1999 Atlantic City Seagulls 83 Connecticut Skyhawks 77
2000 Dodge City Legend 89 Oklahoma Storm 86
2001 Pennsylvania ValleyDawgs 100 Dodge City Legend 91
2002 Oklahoma Storm 122 Kansas Cagerz 109
2003 Dodge City Legend 97 Pennsylvania ValleyDawgs 96
2004 Pennsylvania ValleyDawgs 118 Brooklyn Kings 116
2005 Dodge City Legend 97  Kansas Cagerz 84
2006 Nebraska Cranes 100  Dodge City Legend 92
2007 Kansas Cagerz 95 Brooklyn Kings 92
2008 USBL suspended operations

League awards

Player of the Year 
1985: John "Hot Rod" Williams, Rhode Island Gulls & Tracy Jackson, Springfield Fame
1986: Don Collins, Tampa Bay Flash
1987: Don Collins (2), Tampa Bay Stars
1988: Lewis Lloyd, Philadelphia Aces
1990: Jerry Johnson, Jacksonville Hooters
1991: Michael Anderson, Philadelphia Spirit
1992: Roy Tarpley, Miami Tropics
1993: Ken Bannister, Miami Tropics
1994: Stan Rose, Atlanta Trojans
1995: Charles Smith, Florida Sharks
1996: Brent Scott, Portland Mountain Cats
1997: Dennis Edwards, Florida Sharks
1998: Curt Smith, Washington Congressionals
1999: Adrian Griffin, Atlantic City Seagulls
2000: Sean Colson, Dodge City Legend
2001: Aubrey Reese, Oklahoma Storm
2002: Kwan Johnson, Brevard Blue Ducks
2003: Albert Mouring, Oklahoma Storm
2004: Chudney Gray, Brooklyn Kings
2005: Nate Johnson, Kansas Cagerz
2006: Quannas White, Oklahoma Storm
2007: Anthony Richardson, Kansas Cagerz

Postseason MVP 
1987: World B. Free, Miami Tropics
1988: Bobby Parks, New Haven Skyhawks
1991: Paul Graham, Philadelphia Spirit
1992: Duane Washington, Miami Tropics
1993: Ken Bannister, Miami Tropics
1994: Fred Lewis, Jacksonville Hooters
1995: Charles Smith, Florida Sharks
1996: Charles Smith (2), Florida Sharks
1997: Mark Baker, Atlantic City Seagulls & Brent Scott, Atlantic City Seagulls
1998: Adrian Griffin, Atlantic City Seagulls
1999: Adrian Griffin (2), Atlantic City Seagulls
2001: Frantz Pierre-Louis, Pennsylvania ValleyDawgs & Ace Custis, Pennsylvania ValleyDawgs
2002: Joe Ira Clark, Oklahoma Storm
2003: Darrin Hancock, Dodge City Legend
2004: Marcus Fleming, Pennsylvania ValleyDawgs
2005: Jermaine Boyette, Dodge City Legend
2006: Alex Sanders, Nebraska Cranes
2007: Nate Johnson, Kansas Cagerz

Rookie of the Year 
1985: John "Hot Rod" Williams, Rhode Island Gulls
1986: Marty Embry, Jersey Jammers
1987: Muggsy Bogues, Rhode Island Gulls
1988: Ricky Grace, Jersey Shore Bucs
1990: Randy Henry, Jacksonville Hooters
1991: Greg Sutton, Empire State Stallions
1992: Fred Lewis, Jacksonville Hooters
1993: Khari Jaxon, Palm Beach Stingrays
1994: Randy Carter, Memphis Fire
1995: Roger Crawford, Memphis Fire
1996: Mike Lloyd, Atlantic City Seagulls
1997: Mikki Moore, Atlanta Trojans
1998: Kerry Thompson, Tampa Bay Windjammers
1999: Adrian Pledger, New Hampshire Thunder Loons
2000: Chudney Gray, Long Island Surf
2001: George Evans, Maryland Mustangs
2002: Devin Brown, Kansas Cagerz & Corsley Edwards, Adirondack Wildcats
2003: Lenny Cooke, Brooklyn Kings
2004: Tony Bland, Brevard Blue Ducks
2005: Badou Gaye, Westchester Wildfire & John Allen, New Jersey Flyers
2006: Tristan Smith, Long Island PrimeTime
2007: Adam Schaper, Gary Steelheads

Coach of the Year 
1985: Gerald Oliver, Springfield Fame
1986: Henry Bibby, Springfield Fame
1987: Gordon Gibbons, Tampa Bay Stars
1988: Dave Ervin, Philadelphia Aces
1990: Rex Morgan, Jacksonville Hooters
1991: Bill Lange, Philadelphia Spirit
1992: Al Outlaw, Atlanta Eagles
1993: John Lucas II, Miami Tropics
1994: Al Outlaw (2), Atlanta Trojans
1995: Mike Mashak, Jersey Turnpikes
1996: Eric Musselman, Florida Sharks
1997: Kevin Mackey, Atlantic City Seagulls
1998: Ray Hodge, Connecticut Skyhawks
1999: Darryl Dawkins, Pennsylvania ValleyDawgs & Kevin Mackey (2), Atlantic City Seagulls
2000: Kent Davidson, Dodge City Legend
2001: Robert Parish, Maryland Mustangs
2002: Francis Flax, Kansas Cagerz & Harvey Grant, Brevard Blue Ducks
2003: Cliff Levingston, Dodge City Legend
2004: Dale Osbourne, Dodge City Legend
2005: Ken Charles, Brooklyn Kings
2006: Bryan Gates, Oklahoma Storm
2007: Dale Osbourne (2), Dodge City Legend

Defensive Player of the Year 
2002: Johnny Jackson, Kansas Cagerz
2003: Kevin Freeman, Westchester Wildfire
2004: Immanuel McElroy, Dodge City Legend
2005: Eric Coley, Oklahoma Storm
2006: Anthony Johnson, Kansas Cagerz
2007: Ronald Ross, Albany Patroons

Man of the Year 
1986: Jim Bostic, Westchester Golden Apples
1987: World B. Free, Miami Tropics
1988: Michael Brooks, Philadelphia Aces
1992: John Lucas II, Miami Tropics
1993: Al Outlaw, Atlanta Eagles
1996: Roy Jones Jr., Jacksonville Barracudas

Statistical leaders

Scoring leaders

Rebounding leaders

Assists leaders

Notable past players
Source

 Michael Adams – (Springfield Fame)
 Bong Alvarez - (Pennsylvania ValleyDawgs)
 Michael Anderson – (Philadelphia Aces, Philadelphia Spirit)
 Nate Archibald – (Jersey Shore Bucs)
 Darrell Armstrong – (Atlanta Trojans)
 Raja Bell – (Tampa Bay Windjammers)
 Henry Bibby - (Springfield Fame)
 Mark Blount – (Atlantic City Seagulls, New Jersey Shorecats)
 Tyrone "Muggsy" Bogues – (Rhode Island Gulls)
 Manute Bol – (Rhode Island Gulls)
 Devin Brown – (Kansas Cagerz)
 Chris Childs – (Miami Tropics)
 Lloyd Daniels – (Miami Tropics)
 Yinka Dare – (New Jersey Shorecats)
 Mark Davis – (Long Island Knights)
 Waliyy Dixon – (Atlantic City Seagulls)
 Richard Dumas – (Miami Tropics)
 Mario Elie – (Miami Tropics)
 LeRon Ellis – (Connecticut Skyhawks)
 World B. Free – (Miami Tropics)
 Doug Gottlieb – (Oklahoma Storm)
 Darrin Hancock – (New Jersey Shore Cats, Dodge City Legend, Pennsylvania ValleyDawgs, Kansas Cagerz)
 Antonio Harvey – (Atlanta Eagles)
 Vince Hizon – (Pennsylvania Valleydawgs)
 Craig Hodges – (Washington Congressionals)
 Anderson Hunt – (Miami Tropics)
 Mike James – (Long Island Surf)
 Keith Jennings – (Jacksonville Hooters)
 Avery Johnson – (Palm Beach Stingrays)
 Anthony Jones – (Palm Beach Stingrays)
 Roy Jones Jr. – (Brevard Blue Ducks)
 Eddie Jordan – (Jersey Jammers)
 R. Kelly – (Atlantic City Seagulls)
 Shawn Kemp - Oklahoma Storm
 Rusty LaRue – (Carolina Cardinals)
 Nancy Lieberman – (Springfield Fame)
 Anthony Mason – (Long Island Surf)
 Cheryl Miller – (Staten Island Stallions)
 Jamario Moon – (Dodge City Legend), (Gary Steelheads)
 Marcelo Nicola – (Long Island Surf)
 Moochie Norris – (Washington Congressionals)
 Kevin Ollie – (Connecticut Skyhawks)
 Terrell Owens – (Adirondack Wildcats)
 Victor Page – (Washington Congressionals)
 Simeon Rice – (Philadelphia Power)
 Lynette Richardson – (Miami Tropics)
 Micheal "Sugar" Ray Richardson – (Long Island Knights)
 Cliff Robinson – (Miami Tropics)
 LaMont "ShowBoat" Robinson - (Long Island Knights) 
 Jim Rowinski - (Long Island Surf)
 Shawnelle Scott – (Long Island Surf)
 Charles Smith – (Florida Sharks)
 Curt Smith – (Washington Congressionals)
 Mark Strickland – (Philadelphia Spirit, Atlanta Trojans, Atlantic City Seagulls)
 Derek Strong – (Miami Tropics)
 Roy Tarpley – (Miami Tropics)
 Kelvin Upshaw – (Palmbeach Stingrays)
 Chris Washburn – (Miami Tropics, Westchester Stallions)
 Anthony "Spud" Webb – (Rhode Island Gulls)
 Freeman Williams – (Miami Tropics)
 John "Hot Rod" Williams – (Rhode Island Gulls)
 Lorenzo Williams – (Palmbeach Stingrays)
 Ime Udoka – (Adirondack Wildcats)

See also
 List of developmental and minor sports leagues

References

External links
 HISTORY OF THE UNITED STATES BASKETBALL LEAGUE on apbr.org
 USBL logos
 Press Releases from USBasket

 
Defunct basketball leagues in the United States
Defunct professional sports leagues in the United States
Publicly traded sports companies
Sports leagues established in 1985
Organizations disestablished in 2008
1985 establishments in the United States